Monk square revolution is a Reggae album by Maiko Zulu. The album was produced in 2008 with the hit song Monk Square Revolution. The album may have been inspired by University of Zambia demonstrations that  normally begins outside a student halls of residence called Monk square. This album is also one of the few reggae albums in Africa which features a song to encourages people to vote in a democratic elections.

References

2008 albums
Maiko Zulu albums